Blues & Ballads is a 1960 recording featuring Lonnie Johnson on vocals and electric guitar accompanied by Elmer Snowden on acoustic guitar and Wendell Marshall on bass.  This was the first commercial recording by Snowden in 26 years.  The same ensemble, under the supervision of Chris Albertson, recorded a second volume, Blues, Ballads, and Jumpin' Jazz, released in 1990.

Reception
The album has generally received high acclaim.  Although one writer appears to disregard the album with a single sentence, calling it "just plain sad, lacking even the vitality of rock and roll."  Others have noted Johnson's "plaintive, slightly nasal voice" and indicated that he "sings smooth blues and sentimental ballads with equal skill."  The guitarists styles are described as distinctive, yet complementary, and Snowden is described as a "sympathetic accompanist" with "an easy swingingly graceful style."

One reviewer calls Johnson's performance on the blues numbers "convincing, affecting interpretations," but indicates that his performance on the three ballads is less consistent.  He states, "On 'Memories of You', his approach is gentle and lyrical, and yet his controlled inner tension builds tremendous emotional power.  Two other ballads, his own compositions are too stickily sentimental to be effective."

Track listing 
 "Haunted House" (Lonnie Johnson) – 4:59
 "Memories of You" (Eubie Blake, Andy Razaf) – 4:21
 "Blues for Chris" (Chris Albertson, Elmer Snowden) – 5:04
 "I Found a Dream" (Lonnie Johnson) – 4:33
 "St. Louis Blues" (W.C. Handy) – 3:05
 "I'll Get Along Somehow" (Buddy Fields, Gerald Marks) – 4:27
 "Savoy Blues" (Kid Ory) – 4:11
 "Backwater Blues" (Bessie Smith) – 5:04
 "Elmer's Blues" (Elmer Snowden) – 3:27
 "He's a Jelly Roll Baker" (Lonnie Johnson) – 4:14

Personnel 
 Lonnie Johnson – electric guitar, vocals
 Elmer Snowden – acoustic guitar
 Wendell Marshall – bass
 Chris Albertson – producer, supervisor & liner notes
 Rudy Van Gelder – engineer
 Kirk Felton – Digital remastering (1990 Fantasy Studios Berkeley)

Release history

References 

1960 albums
Lonnie Johnson (musician) albums
Elmer Snowden albums
Bluesville Records albums
Albums recorded at Van Gelder Studio
Ace Records (United States) albums